Abdoulaye Diarrassouba, also known as Aboudia, is an American-Ivorian contemporary artist based in Brooklyn, New York, and who works from his studios in Abidjan and New York City. He was born on October 21, 1983 in Côte d'Ivoire, and graduated from the School of Applied Arts in Bingerville in 2003.  In 2005, he graduated from the Institut des Arts in Abidjan. He first reached an international audience during the siege of Abidjan in 2011, when the conflict came close to his studio. Some of his works has been exhibited in Basel, Miami, New York, Singapore, and Art Central in Hong Kong. He has also done various solo shows with galleries in New York, London, Barcelona, Copenhagen and more. In 2012, he collaborated with Ivorian artist Frédéric Bruly Bouabré on producing a unique series of paintings exhibited in Abidjan. In 2017 Abdoulaye collaborated with British internationally acclaimed painter Christian Furr, producing works between New York, London and Abidjan.

Career

Since the age of 15, Abdoulaye has been on his own as an artist. He was kicked out of his childhood home by his father once it was known that Abdoulaye wanted to become an artist. His mother gave him the last of his savings to complete a scholarship. While being at the top of his class, he slept in the classroom when everyone else would leave for the day.

Throughout 2007 and 2008 Aboudia marched around Bingerville and the centre of Abidjan, where the galleries were located.  And also Ivorian gallery owners turn him away and later on mocked his style of painting. After some time,  people began to buy Aboudia work, mostly ambassadors and gallery owners in other countries.
In December 2010, Alassane Ouattara was declared the winner of the second round of the presidential election. The current president at  the time Laurent Gbagbo, did not accept the initial result. Laurent ordered the military to close the country's borders and foreign news organisation were banned. Tensions continued to mount as he was sworn in as president. During this time Abdoulaye was able to paint 21 canvases ranging from 120 x 80 cm to 400 x 180 cm.

In 2012 and 2014, Abdoulaye's work was exhibited in the Ivory Coast, at the Galerie Cécile Fakhoury in Abidjan, as well as Europe and North America, and bought by influential contemporary art collectors including Charles Saatchi, Jean Pigozzi and Frank Cohen. Aboudia is influenced by a synthesis of American avant-garde traditions and the graffiti in the communities where he lives. Many in the art world relate his work to Jean-Michel Basquiat, who was the first black American who gained fame for his contemporary paintings with African characteristics. Basquiat combined African and Afro-American culture and style in his work, which may seem an irritating and predictable way to establish the value of a young painter's work. This fusion of culture and style can be seen in Abdouia's work as well. Abdouia's work uses both indirect and direct references  to African and Western styles. In fact, the riots that followed the disputed Ivorian presidential election in late 2010 greatly influenced Aboudia's painting. He refuses to be categorized as a 'war painter'.

While some artists chose to flee the civil war, Aboudia decided to stay and continue working despite the danger. He worked in an artist's studio right next to the Golf Hotel [Ouattara's headquarters during the post-electoral crisis]; he could hear the bullets zipping through the air while he painted. When the shooting got too heavy, he hid in the cellar and tried to imagine what was going on. As soon as things calmed down he would go back upstairs and paint everything he had in mind. Whenever he was able to go outside, he would paint everything he saw as soon as he returned. Some of his paintings were also inspired by footages he saw on the news or the internet. His body of work, which he describes as “nouchi”, is a tribute to the essence of dreams and language. He uses materials within easy reach to express the maximum depth of content with a minimum of resources. Local galleries refused to represent his works. Most of his work, which is seen as too avant-garde for local Ivorian tastes, is bought by foreigners. The disapproval from his people did not swerve his decision to depict this national crisis in his paintings. "As an artist, my contribution is to tell our story for the next generation. Writers will write, singers will sing. I paint," Aboudia said  After the war broke out, the themes of his painting changed.  His goal was to create a record of Côte d'Ivoire's recent history. Now, he goes back to his original themes which are childhood in the streets, poorness, and child soldiers.

Style
Aboudia depicts fevered landscapes and street scenes populated by childlike figures in his graffiti like style. “Assassin” powerfully demonstrates Aboudia's trademark "nouchi" style. Rendered in oil sticks, acrylics and collage, his works are noted for brutal lines of color applied to heavily layered background collages, details of newspaper and magazine cutouts ingeniously encircled by drawings fall in and out of focus. The resulting composition suggests current events cohering through the imagination into a provocative vision.

Aboudia's multi-layered paintings offer a simultaneity of images and meanings that conduct a continuous discourse with each other and with the viewer. The surfaces deploy fragments, cuttings, from bits of comic strips, magazine ads, newspaper images, set into the paintings' overall compositions so as to suggest current events cohering through the imagination into a troubled and troubling vision.

" My style shifted from one that was classic and academic in nature, as well as highly influence by the African culture and decoration, into one increasingly influence by wall scribbles."

His main subject was mural art. There would be simple drawings on the walls, done by the youth using charcoal, mostly of cars, televisions, status symbols, statements and saying; children are seen as the weakest, not taken seriously and left alone in the world.

Exhibitions

Solo

2021
 "Tokyo" – Galerie Cécile Fakhoury, Abidjan, Côte d’Ivoire.

2018
 "Djoly du Mogoba" – Jack Bell Gallery, London, UK.

2017
 "Talking Faces" – Piasa, Paris, France
 "Gawa Dangoro" – Jack Bell Gallery – London, UK.

2016

 "I have a dream" – OOA Gallery, Barcelona, Spain
 "Môgô Dynasty" – Cécile Fakhoury Gallery, Abidjan, Ivory Coast
 "Bombe fantôme" – Jack Bell Gallery, London, UK
 "Talking heads" – Ethan Cohen Gallery, New York, USA
 "Chap Chap" – Art Twenty One, Lagos, Nigeria

2015
 "Sossoroh urbain" – Jack Bell Gallery, London, UK

2014
 "Nouchi City" – Cécile Fakhoury Gallery, Abidjan, Ivory Coast
 "African Dawn | ABOUDIA" – Ethan Cohen Gallery, New York, USA
 "Trin Trin Ba-By" – Jack Bell Gallery, London, UK

2013
 "Quitte le pouvoir: New Paintings by Aboudia" – Jack Bell Gallery, London, UK

2012
 «Aujourd’hui, je travaille avec mon petit-fils Aboudia » duo show with Frederic Bruly Bouabre – Cécile Fakhoury Gallery, Abidjan, Ivory Coast

2011
 "Travaux récents" – Le Lab 2.0 Gallery, Abidjan, Ivory Coast
 Goethe-Institut, Johannesburg, South Africa
 "The Battle For Abidjan" – Jack Bell Gallery, London, UK

2009
 Centre Culturel Français, Abidjan, Ivory Coast
 Centre Culturel Français, Conakry, Guinea

Group

2018
 "Angels" – OOA Gallery, Barcelona, Spain
 Art X – OOA Gallery, Lagos, Nigeria
 "Rassemblement" – Jack Bell Gallery, London, UK
 1:54 – Cécile Fakhoury Gallery, Marrakech, Morocco

2017
 "Summer Exhibition" – Royal Academy of Arts, London, UK
 "Regarding Africa: Contemporary Art and Afro-Futurism" – Tel Aviv Museum of Art, Israël
 "AKAA" – OOA Gallery, Paris, France
 Salon Zürcher – OOA Gallery, Paris, France

2016
 1:54 – Cécile Fakhoury Gallery, London, UK
 "Dakar-Martigny : Hommage à la Biennale d’Art contemporain" – Martigny, Switzerland

2015
 1:54 – Cécile Fakhoury Gallery, Pioneer Works, Brooklyn, USA
 "Pangaea II: New Art From Africa And Latin America" – Saatchi Gallery, London, UK
 "Studio Lumiere" – Jack Bell Gallery, London, UK

2014
 Sphères #7, Continua Gallery, Les Moulins, France
 1:54 – Cécile Fakhoury Gallery, Somerset House, London, UK
 Group Show Galerie Cécile Fakhoury, Abidjan, Côte d'Ivoire
 "Pangaea: New Art From Africa And Latin America" – Saatchi Gallery, London, UK
 Dak’Art Off – Group Show Cécile Fakhoury Gallery, La Fondation Total, Dakar, Senegal

2013
 "In all Cases; A Collection Selection" – Nevada Museum of Art, Reno, USA

2012
 "Aujourd’hui je travaille avec mon petit fils Aboudia" (in collaboration with Frédéric Bruly Bouabré) – Cécile Fakhoury Gallery, Abidjan, Ivory Coast
 Dak’Art Off – Eiffage, Dakar, Senegal

2011
 Amani – Abidjan, Ivory Coast
 Salon International des Arts Plastiques – Abidjan, Ivory Coast
 "Revue de l’Art Moderne et Contemporain" – Rotonde des Arts, Abidjan, Ivory Coast
 "Les Fantômes" – Jack Bell Gallery, London, UK

2010
 "Arkadi, 13th edition" – Centre culturel français, Abidjan, Ivory Coast
 "Lion's Art" – Abidjan, Ivory Coast
 "Amis des arts, 6th editiom" – BICICI Bank, Abidjan, Ivory Coast
 "50e Journée de célébration de l’indépendance de la Côte d'Ivoire", Ivory Coast

2009
 "Pinceaux d’Afrique" – Stockholm, Sweden
 Arkadi, 12th edition, Centre Culturel Français, Abidjan, Ivory Coast

2007
 Palais de la Culture – Abidjan, Ivory Coast

References

External links
 Ethan Cohen Fine Arts Official Website

21st-century Ivorian male artists
American contemporary artists
People from Abidjan